Donald Ray "Billy" Matthews (October 3, 1907 – October 26, 1997) was a U.S. Representative from Florida from 1953 to 1967.

Life and career
Born in Micanopy, Florida, Matthews attended the public schools of Hawthorne, Florida.
He graduated from the University of Florida at Gainesville in 1929 and taught school in Leesburg, Florida, and in Orlando, Florida from 1929 to 1935. He also served as a high school principal in Newberry, Florida in 1935 and 1936.

He served as a member of the State house of representatives in 1935 was a member of the administrative staff of the University of Florida from 1936 to 1952.

He served in the United States Army 1942–1946 and was discharged as a captain of Infantry.
He served as assistant State 4-H agent in the summers of 1928–1938.

Congress
Matthews was elected as a Democrat to the Eighty-third and to the six succeeding Congresses (January 3, 1953 – January 3, 1967), during which time he was a signatory to the 1956 Southern Manifesto that opposed the desegregation of public schools ordered by the Supreme Court in Brown v. Board of Education.
He was an unsuccessful candidate for reelection to the Ninetieth Congress in 1966, defeated in the Democratic primary by Don Fuqua.

Later career and death
In his post-congressional years, Matthews worked as a consultant and administrator for the Rural Community Development Service of the United States Department of Agriculture from 1967 to 1969; and was an instructor of political science at Santa Fe Community College (Gainesville, Florida) from 1969 to 1977.

He was a resident of Gainesville, Florida until his death at the age of 90.
He was interred at Hawthorne Cemetery.

References

1907 births
1997 deaths
20th-century American politicians
American school principals
Schoolteachers from Florida
Democratic Party members of the Florida House of Representatives
Military personnel from Florida
People from Gainesville, Florida
Democratic Party members of the United States House of Representatives from Florida
People from Micanopy, Florida
United States Army officers
University of Florida alumni
University of Florida faculty
American segregationists